Sivasamy is an Indian surname. Notable people with the surname include:

C. Sivasamy, Indian politician
K. K. Sivasamy, Indian politician

Surnames of Indian origin